Ličartovce is a village and municipality in Prešov District in the Prešov Region of eastern Slovakia.

History
In historical records the village was first mentioned in 1249.

Geography

References

External links
 
 
https://web.archive.org/web/20070427022352/http://www.statistics.sk/mosmis/eng/run.html
https://web.archive.org/web/20070913225916/http://www.licartovce.ocu.sk/

Villages and municipalities in Prešov District
Šariš